Spondon railway station serves the Spondon area of Derby, England. The station is owned by Network Rail and managed by East Midlands Railway.

Spondon is a penalty fare station if travelling with EMR. It is an unstaffed station equipped with a permit to travel machine.

History 
Lying on the Derby–Nottingham line, the first station on the site was opened by the Midland Counties Railway (MCR) on 5 June 1839. The fifth station from Nottingham, it was kept by a Mr. Carter.

Trains to Spondon originally left from the north end of Derby station before turning east towards Nottingham. However, on 27 June 1867 the Midland Railway, successor to the MCR, opened a new route towards Nottingham (and London) which led from the south end of Derby station (so that Manchester – London trains would no longer have to reverse at Derby). The new route and the old joined immediately west of Spondon, which was to remain a junction station until 1969, when the original, more northerly, connection to Derby was closed as a through route.

The station was enlarged in the early 20th century to cope with the volume of traffic for the nearby British Celanese plant. In the 1920s, more than 14,000 worked here. The station is also the location of the junction for rail freight traffic into the British Celanese works.

It was planned that both platforms would be extended by up to 25 metres no later than 2012.

Stationmasters
On 13 August 1924 the station master, Henry Ernest Haines, was killed in the stationmaster’s house when a lorry crashed into the building. The driver of the lorry was heading for the British Celanese works and had crossed the canal bridge when he realised that the level crossing gates were closed. He was unable to stop and rather than run into the gates he steered into the stationmaster’s house and office. 

Joseph Chambers 1857 - 1876
G. Bailey 1876 - 1886
James C. Chidgey 1886 - 1897 (afterwards station master at Redland, Bristol)
Samuel Pitt 1897 - 1898 (formerly station master at Oakley, Bedfordshire, afterwards station master at Rowsley)
Frank Porter 1898 - 1901 (formerly station master at East Langton, afterwards station master at Bakewell)
William Cope 1901 - 1909 (afterwards station master at Duffield)
James Harford 1909? - 1921 (formerly station master at Tibshelf, afterwards station master at Chinley)
Henry Ernest Haines 1921 - 1924
Ernest J. Brooks 1925 - 1931 (formerly station master at Thrapstone)
W.B. Barker 1932 - 1940 
Edmund T. Jackson 1940 - 1947 (formerly station master at Dronfield, afterwards station master at Belper)
G.R. Hemmings 1947 Onwards (formerly station master at Rowsley)

Current services

Train services at Spondon are operated by East Midlands Railway and CrossCountry.

The typical off-peak service in trains per hour is:
 1 tph to 
 1 tph to  via 

Prior to May 2021, the station was served by a limited service with regular hourly services being introduced on that years timetable change. However, from Saturday 19 June 2021 until further notice, the hourly service was replaced by a two hourly bus service to Derby.

Fast trains on the Midland Main Line pass by the station but do not stop.

There is no Sunday service.

References

The Nottingham and Derby Railway Companion, (1839) Republished 1979 with foreword by J.B.Radford, Derbyshire Record Society
Higginson, M, (1989) The Midland Counties Railway: A Pictorial Survey, Derby: Midland Railway Trust.

External links

Railway stations in Derby
DfT Category F2 stations
Former Midland Railway stations
Railway stations in Great Britain opened in 1839
Railway stations served by East Midlands Railway
Railway stations served by CrossCountry